Clarkia unguiculata is a species of wildflower known by the common name elegant clarkia or mountain garland. This plant is endemic to California, where it is found in many woodland habitats. Specifically it is common on the forest floor of many oak woodlands, along with typical understory wildflowers that include Calochortus luteus, Cynoglossum grande and Delphinium variegatum. C. unguiculata presents a spindly, hairless, waxy stem not exceeding a meter in height and bears occasional narrow leaves. The showy flowers have hairy, fused sepals forming a cup beneath the corolla, and four petals each one to 2.5 centimeters long. The paddle-like petals are a shade of pink to reddish to purple and are slender and diamond-shaped or triangular. There are eight long stamens, the outer four of which have large red anthers. The stigma protrudes from the flower and can be quite large. Flowers of the genus Clarkia are primarily pollinated by specialist bees found in their native habitat  "Clarkias independently developed self-pollination in 12 lineages."

References

 C. Michael Hogan. 2009. Gold Nuggets: Calochortus luteus, GlobalTwitcher.com, ed. N. Stromberg
 Jepson Manual. 1993. Clarkia unguiculata
Moeller, D. A., et al. 2005. Ecological context of the evolution of self-pollination in Clarkia xantiana: Population size, plant communities, and reproductive assurance. Evolution. 59(4):786-99.

External links

 Calphotos photo gallery

unguiculata
Endemic flora of California
Flora of the Sierra Nevada (United States)
Natural history of the California chaparral and woodlands
Natural history of the California Coast Ranges
Natural history of the Peninsular Ranges
Natural history of the Santa Monica Mountains
Natural history of the Transverse Ranges
Plants described in 1837
Flora without expected TNC conservation status